Next Aisle Over is a 1919 American short comedy film starring Harold Lloyd.

Plot
Bebe is employed as a counter girl in a department store.  Harold is her boyfriend.  When he arrives at the store to peddle samples of his company's goods, he runs afoul of the manager.  Bebe gets him out of trouble temporarily by saying he's the new shoe salesman.  Harold creates chaos trying to sell shoes to a variety of customers.  Harold eventually thwarts three crooks who intend to poison the staff and abduct Bebe.

Cast
 Harold Lloyd 
 Snub Pollard
 Bebe Daniels
 Sammy Brooks
 Billy Fay
 William Gillespie
 Lew Harvey
 Wallace Howe
 Margaret Joslin
 William Petterson
 Dorothea Wolbert

See also
 Harold Lloyd filmography

References

External links

1919 films
1919 short films
American silent short films
1919 comedy films
American black-and-white films
Films directed by Hal Roach
Silent American comedy films
Films with screenplays by H. M. Walker
American comedy short films
1910s American films
1910s English-language films